Pat Crawford may refer to:

Pat Crawford Australian cricketer
Pat Crawford (baseball) American baseball player
Pat Crawford Brown, American actress